Marcus O'Sullivan (born in Cork, Ireland on 22 December 1961) is an Irish retired middle-distance runner. He competed for Ireland at four Summer Olympics. After Steve Scott and John Walker, he is the third all-time by total of sub-4 minute miles run over the course of his career, at 101.

Running career
Although he wasn't planning to go to any of Ireland's universities, O'Sullivan's running encouraged him to go to Villanova University at 19. While competing on a collegiate level, he worked towards a degree in accounting and later attained an MBA and a CPA.

The three World Indoor 1500 metre Championships won by O'Sullivan were in 1987 (Indianapolis), 1989 (Budapest), and 1993 (Toronto). In his victories in 1987 and 1989, he set championship records. He was 4th in the 1991 Seville world indoor championships.

At the 1985 European Athletics Indoor Championships, O'Sullivan won a silver medal in the 1500m.

O'Sullivan qualified for four Olympic Games for Ireland: 1984, 1988, 1992, and 1996, at both 800 metres and 1500 metres. He reached the 1500 metre finals at the 1988 Seoul Olympics.

He set an indoor 1500 metres world record of 3:35.4 on 10 February 1989, and was generally regarded as a better competitor running indoors.  This is evidenced by the fact that O'Sullivan won the prestigious Wanamaker Mile in Madison Square Garden's Millrose Games six times (1986, 1988, 1989, 1990, 1992, and 1996).

His personal best for the mile, which was set indoors in 1988, is 3:50.94. His personal best for the 1500 metres, which was set outdoors in 1996, is 3:33.61.

O'Sullivan, along with Irish runners Ray Flynn, Eamonn Coghlan, and Frank O'Mara established the still standing world record in the 4 x 1 mile relay, when they combined in Dublin on 17 August 1985 to run 15:49.08.

O'Sullivan now runs the RunningWorks cross country camp during the summer, and is the head coach of Villanova cross country and track and field.  He was coached by Tom Donnelly of Haverford College and advised Bob Kennedy in the later years before Kennedy's retirement.

In addition to his ties to American record holder Bob Kennedy, O'Sullivan has coached elite professional runners such as Canadian indoor world silver medalist Carmen Douma-Hussar, and New Zealander Adrian Blincoe.

He has a daughter named Laura O'Sullivan, who attends the University of Pennsylvania School of Veterinary Medicine and a son, Christopher O'Sullivan who attends Villanova University .

He also runs a summer camp called Running Works, along with Cricket Batz. It takes place in Canadensis, PA, and is a one-week sleep away camp where High School cross-country runners stay in cabins .

References

External links 

Athlete Profile Marcus 0'Sullivan All-Athletics

1961 births
Living people
Athletes from the Republic of Ireland
Irish male middle-distance runners
Athletes (track and field) at the 1984 Summer Olympics
Athletes (track and field) at the 1988 Summer Olympics
Athletes (track and field) at the 1992 Summer Olympics
Athletes (track and field) at the 1996 Summer Olympics
Olympic athletes of Ireland
Villanova Wildcats men's track and field athletes
People educated at Coláiste Chríost Rí
Goodwill Games medalists in athletics
World Athletics Indoor Championships winners
Competitors at the 1990 Goodwill Games